The 1904 DePauw football team was an American football team that represented DePauw University in the 1904 college football season.

Schedule

References

DePauw
DePauw Tigers football seasons
DePauw football